P86 may refer to:

Vessels 
 , a fast attack craft of the Argentine Navy
 , a patrol boat of the Royal Australian Navy
 , a submarine of the Royal Navy

Other uses 
 DLR P86 stock, a passenger train
 North American XP-86, an American prototype fighter aircraft
 Papyrus 86, a biblical manuscript
 Project 86, an American rock band
 P86, a state regional road in Latvia